Hermética is the debut album by Argentine thrash metal band Hermética, released in 1989.

Details
After the disbandment of V8, in 1987, bass player Ricardo Iorio formed Hermética, a thrash metal band featuring vocalist Claudio O'Connor, guitar player Antonio "Tano" Romano, and drummer Tony Scotto.
The group recorded the songs which would be part of this album at Estudios Sonovisión, in Buenos Aires, during May–June, 1989.

The album was released on LP and cassette in 1989. The re-issue on CD through Radio Trípoli/DBN, from 1991, also includes Intérpretes, the first EP of the band.

Track listing

All lyrics composed by Ricardo Iorio

Personnel
Band
Claudio O'Connor - lead vocals.
Ricardo Iorio - bass guitar, vocals on ″Vida Impersonal″, ″Desde El Oeste″ and "Yo No Lo Haré".
Antonio Romano - guitar.
Tony Scotto - drums.

Others
 Nestor "Pajaro" Randazzo - sound engineer
 Cristian Jeroncic - assistant
 Marcelo Tommy Moya - management
 Franco Medici - artwork

References

1989 debut albums
Hermética albums